Rozoy is part of the name of several communes in France:
 Rozoy-le-Vieil in Loiret
 Chéry-lès-Rozoy in Aisne
 Grand-Rozoy in Aisne
 Rozoy-Bellevalle in Aisne
 Rozoy-sur-Serre in Aisne